Leonie Ebert (born 4 October 1999) is a German fencer. She competed in the women's foil event at the 2020 Summer Olympics.

References

External links
 

1999 births
Living people
German female fencers
Olympic fencers of Germany
Fencers at the 2020 Summer Olympics
Place of birth missing (living people)
21st-century German women